Leslie Herbert Ashley Brunning (26 May 1886 – 12 December 1947) was an Australian rules footballer who played with St Kilda in the Victorian Football League (VFL).

References

External links 

1886 births
1947 deaths
Australian rules footballers from Victoria (Australia)
St Kilda Football Club players